Admiral King-Hall may refer to:

George King-Hall (1850–1939), British Royal Navy admiral
Herbert King-Hall (1862–1936), British Royal Navy admiral
William King-Hall (1816–1886), British Royal Navy admiral

See also
Admiral Hall (disambiguation)
Admiral King (disambiguation)